Summer Challenge Camp is a Pakistani sports Reality Show for children. It was initially aired on Indus Vision in 2009. In this show, 40 children are shortlisted after physical trials and 8 teams of 5 each are formed. These children stay at the event venue for 10 days. These eight teams compete in different sports and finally 1 team wins at the end of day 10. Trials, training and competitions are recorded and aired in 13 episodes.

Sports 
Teams compete in Archery, Bowling, Cricket, Table Tennis and Swimming. Cricket is played on 5a-side format. Other 4 sports are played by individuals rather than whole team. Each victory adds points in the team score. Runner up and 2nd runner up also receive some points.

Training 
Participants are trained in all sports, except bowling, by current and former national champions like Moin Khan, Mohammad Sami and Khalid Latif. Shahid Afridi made an appearance in Season 1. Celebrities from other sports give motivational and dietary speeches. These include Abuzar Umrao (hockey Olympian), Anwar Saeed (national Badminton champion), and Nameer Shamsi (represented Pakistan in Junior Davis Cup in 2010).

References 

Pakistani reality television series